Cromna or Kromna was a town on the Paphlagonian coast, now in modern Turkey. It is mentioned by Homer in the Iliad. It was 60 stadia east of Erythini and 90 west of Cytorus. There are autonomous coins of Cromna. 

The site of Cromna has been the subject of some disagreement among sources: Amasra and Kurucaşile both being suggested. However, modern scholars place its site near modern Tekeönü in Bartın Province.

References

Populated places in ancient Paphlagonia
Former populated places in Turkey
Locations in the Iliad
History of Bartın Province